Mirny is a rural locality (a settlement) in Solyansky Selsoviet, Narimanovsky District, Astrakhan Oblast, Russia. The population was 514 as of 2010. There are 41 streets.

Geography 
Mirny is located 39 km south of Narimanov (the district's administrative centre) by road. Prigorodny is the nearest rural locality.

References 

Rural localities in Narimanovsky District